The 1954 Pau Grand Prix was a non-championship Formula One motor race held on 19 April 1954 at the Pau circuit, in Pau, Pyrénées-Atlantiques, France. The Grand Prix was won by Jean Behra, driving with Equipe Gordini. Maurice Trintignant finished second and Roberto Mieres third.

Classification

Race

References

Pau Grand Prix
Pau
1954 in French motorsport